Federico Fernández Senderos (born 29 March 1968 in Nopalucan, Mexico) is an equestrian showjumper.

He represented his country in the 2004 Summer Olympics in both the individual and team jumping events.  

In 2006, he competed in the 2006 FEI World Equestrian Games (again, both the individual jumping and team jumping events).

Similar to 2004, Fernandez represented Mexico in the individual and team jumping events of the 2008 Summer Olympics and 2012 Summer Olympics.

References 
 
 JustWorld International profile of Federico Fernandez

1968 births
Living people
Show jumping riders
Olympic equestrians of Mexico
Mexican male equestrians
Equestrians at the 2004 Summer Olympics
Equestrians at the 2008 Summer Olympics
Equestrians at the 2012 Summer Olympics
Equestrians at the 2015 Pan American Games
Sportspeople from Puebla
Pan American Games competitors for Mexico